Centre for Distance Education may refer to:
 Athabasca University
 Centre for Distance Education, University of London